KacL may refer to:

 Neamine transaminase, an enzyme
 2'-Deamino-2'-hydroxyneamine transaminase, an enzyme